Shamrocks and Shenanigans may refer to:

Music 

 "Shamrocks and Shenanigans (Boom Shalock Lock Boom)", a 1992 single by American hip hop group House Of Pain
 Shamrocks & Shenanigans, a 2004 compilation album by Everlast and House Of Pain